The 1892 Alabama gubernatorial election took place on August 1, 1892, in order to elect the governor of Alabama.

Results

References

1892
gubernatorial
Alabama
August 1892 events